The PL-01 was a Polish light tank concept created by OBRUM with support from BAE Systems, based on the Swedish CV90120-T light tank. The concept vehicle was first unveiled at the International Defence Industry Exhibition in Kielce on 2 September 2013, but the project was scrapped in 2015.

Design

The layout of the PL-01 is similar to modern standard main battle tanks. The driver is located at the front of the vehicle's hull, with the commander and gunner also located in the hull and the unmanned turret mounted in the rear. In addition, there is a rear compartment in the hull that can accommodate four soldiers. The vehicle chassis is based on that of the Combat Vehicle 90.

The vehicle armor has a modular ceramic-aramid shell, which is designed to provide protection compatible with NATO standard STANAG 4569 Annex A at level 5+ across the front portions of the hull and turret. Additional armor panels are mounted on the turret and hull and are designed to provide full protection against a range of projectiles. The hull of the vehicle provides protection against improvised explosive devices (IEDs) and landmines in accordance with appendix B parts 4a and 4b of the STANAG 4569 standard. The entire vehicle will be covered with radiation-absorbent material to create a Stealth ground vehicle.

The PL-01 would be equipped with a + diesel engine coupled to a torque converter, automatic gearbox, and driving assistance mechanism. The suspension is based on seven wheels, with the drive shafts having active damping of torsion bars mounted on the first and last two pairs.

Weapons
The primary weapon of the PL-01 is a 105mm or 120mm cannon fitted within the unmanned turret, in accordance with NATO standards. The cannon will be able to shoot both conventional projectiles and guided anti-tank missiles. It has an automatic loader for its main cannon, which ensures a fire rate of 6 shots per minute. The vehicle carries 45 rounds, 16 of which are stored within the turret and ready to fire, with the remainder stored within the chassis compartment. The tank is also armed with a 7.62 mm UKM-2000C machine gun with an ammunition supply of 1,000 rounds.

Additional equipment would be installed in a remote-controlled module. Planned designs included a 7.62mm or 12.7mm machine gun or a 40 mm automatic grenade launcher with a supply of 8,000 rounds of 7.62 mm, 400 rounds of 12.7 mm or 96 rounds of 40 mm grenades. Also built into the turret is an active protection system which intercepts incoming missiles, and smoke grenade launchers.

All equipment will be electronically stabilized, and observation and sighting systems will come with laser rangefinders, day-night cameras, and third-generation thermal imaging, with visual data displayed on a screen.

Equipment
The PL-01 is fitted with a fire extinguishing system in the turret and hull, an internal radio communication system, an active anti-projectile protection system, a battlefield management system, a cooling exhaust system, a thermal masking system, and air conditioning filters. The crew is provided with special seats to minimize the physical effects of nearby explosions. In addition, the vehicle may be equipped with a satellite navigation system and friend-foe identification system.

Variants
In addition to its direct fire role, the vehicle can be configured as a command vehicle, mine clearance vehicle, or armored vehicle repair.

References

Light tanks of Poland
Fire support vehicles
Stealth technology